Bruno Araújo da Silva Chalkiadakis (born 7 April 1993), sometimes known as just Bruno, is a Brazilian-born Greek professional footballer who plays as an attacking midfielder.

Club career

Ergotelis
Bruno Chalkiadakis arrived in Greece at the age of 16, when he was spotted by Ergotelis scouters in Brazil. Considering him to be a strong prospect for the men's team, the club quickly arranged for his legal adoption by the club-affiliated Chalkiadakis family, which earned him Greek citizenship. He initially played with the youth team of Ergotelis, and signed his first professional contract with the club on 24 May 2011. He made his debut as a substitute on 11 December 2011, in a home match against club rival OFI. 
Bruno renewed his contract with the club on 21 August 2014, after a short-term dispute which temporarily placed him out of the team and had since been a regular starter. Despite Ergotelis' relegation at the end of the season, he impressed with his skills, having scored 5 goals in a total of 29 season appearances for the club. He scored his first goal in a 4-1 away win against Niki Volos on 21 September 2014.

Panionios
On 21 May 2015 Bruno Chalkiadakis was transferred to Greek Superleague champions Olympiacos, signing a 5-year contract with the club. He was eventually however not included in the club's roster selection and as a result, he was released from his contract to sign a two-year deal with fellow Superleague side Panionios as a free agent. Bruno spent the majority of the 2015−16 season playing as a substitute, making a total of 31 appearances for the club and scoring two goals during the Greek Cup Group stage. Panionios finished in fifth place and would have qualified for the Europa League second qualifying round, but they were eventually excluded from participating in the 2016–17 European competitions by UEFA for financial reasons. In the summer of 2016, Bruno Chalkiadakis breached his contract with Panionios after failing to report for the club's 2016−17 activities after his official leave for spending the summer vacation in his hometown expired.

Cascavel 
During his stay in Brazil, Bruno Chalkiadakis played football for Paraná local side Cascavel during the first half of 2017.

PAS Giannina 
In July 2017, Bruno Chalkiadakis returned to Greece and signed a contract with Superleague club PAS Giannina for a duration of 3 years. On 18 September 2017, he scored his first goal for the club in a 1−1 home draw game against his former club Panionios. On 14 October 2017, he scored during a 3−1 home Superleague win game against Platanias. He finished the season with 3 goals and 4 assists in 31 club appearances in both League and Cup competitions. In June 2018, Chalkiadakis was released from his contract with PAS Giannina on mutual consent.

Hermannstadt 
On 5 July 2018, Bruno Chalkiadakis signed with Romanian club Hermannstadt based in the city of Sibiu, playing in the Liga I, for 2 years for an undisclosed fee.

Santorini 2020 
In October 2020, Bruno Chalkiadakis signed for AE Santorini 2020.

Agrotikos Asteras 
In February 2022, Bruno Chalkiadakis returned to the Greek League signing a contract with Agrotikos Asteras.

International career
Having acquired Greek citizenship, Bruno Chalkiadakis is eligible to play for the Greece national football team and was actually called up in the Greece national under-19 football team pre-selection for the 2012 Qatar Youth International Tournament along with team-mate Andreas Bouchalakis, before suffering an anterior cruciate ligament injury during a post-season Ergotelis friendly, which eventually kept him out of the tournament.

References

External links
 

1993 births
Living people
Sportspeople from Ceará
Ergotelis F.C. players
Panionios F.C. players
Super League Greece players
Greek footballers
Greece youth international footballers
Brazilian footballers
Greek people of Brazilian descent
Brazilian people of Greek descent
PAS Giannina F.C. players
Olympiacos F.C. players
Liga I players
FC Hermannstadt players
Greek expatriate footballers
Greek expatriate sportspeople in Romania
Expatriate footballers in Romania
Association football forwards